Topolnica may refer to:

Topolnica, Poland
Topolnica, Majdanpek in Serbia
Topolnica, Radoviš in North Macedonia
Topoľnica in Slovakia
Promachonas-Topolnica, a Late Neolithic settlement near Promachonas, Greece

See also
Topolnitsa (disambiguation)
Topola (disambiguation)
Topoľníky